Neiba Kronu is a Nationalist Democratic Progressive Party politician from Nagaland. He has been elected in Nagaland Legislative Assembly election in 2008, 2013 as a candidate of Naga People's Front and in 2018 from Pfütsero constituency as candidate of Nationalist Democratic Progressive Party. He was Minister of Planning & Co-ordination and Land revenue in Fourth Neiphiu Rio ministry from 2018-2023.

References 

Living people
Nationalist Democratic Progressive Party politicians
Nagaland MLAs 2018–2023
Naga People's Front politicians
Year of birth missing (living people)
People from Phek district
People from Kohima
Naga people